Rosalyn Fairbank and Tanya Harford were the defending champions, but lost in the third round to Mary-Lou Piatek and Sharon Walsh.

Martina Navratilova and Anne Smith won the title, defeating Rosemary Casals and Wendy Turnbull in the final 6–3, 6–4.

Seeds
 Rosemary Casals /  Wendy Turnbull (final)
 Martina Navratilova /  Anne Smith (champions)
 Candy Reynolds /  Paula Smith (quarterfinals)
 JoAnne Russell /  Virginia Ruzici (second round)
 Rosalyn Fairbank /  Tanya Harford (third round)
 Leslie Allen /  Mima Jaušovec (second round)
 Bettina Bunge /  Claudia Kohde-Kilsch (quarterfinals)
 Jo Durie /  Anne Hobbs (third round)

Draw

Finals

Top half

Section 1

Section 2

Bottom half

Section 3

Section 4

References
1982 French Open – Women's draws and results at the International Tennis Federation

Women's Doubles
French Open by year – Women's doubles
1982 in women's tennis
1982 in French women's sport